Behold the Bridegroom Arriving is a painting by Nikolaos Gyzis, from 1899.

Description 
The painting is an oil on canvas with dimensions  of 200 x 200 centimeters. It is in the collection of the National Gallery, in Athens.

Analysis 
The scene depicts the second coming of Christ, on a throne, against a purple and gold background.

References 

1899 paintings